Blair Baxter is a New Zealand rugby union coach. He is currently the head coach of Matatū in the Super Rugby Aupiki competition, and Canterbury in the Farah Palmer Cup competition.

Biography 
In 2019, Baxter was the assistant coach of Canterbury's under-19 team when they won the Jock Hobbs Memorial National Tournament. He was appointed as Canterbury's head coach in 2020 and helped guide them to win the Farah Palmer Cup that year.

Baxter was appointed the head coach of the South Island women’s team, Matatū, that competed in the inaugural Super Rugby Aupiki competition in 2022.

References 

Living people
New Zealand rugby union coaches
Year of birth missing (living people)